Eleanor Hallowell Abbott (Mrs. Fordyce Coburn) (September 22, 1872 – June 4, 1958) was an American author. She was a frequent contributor to The Ladies' Home Journal.

Early life
Eleanor Hallowell Abbott was born on September 22, 1872, in Cambridge, Massachusetts. Abbott was the daughter of clergyman Edward Abbott and Clara (Davis), who edited the journal Literary World; and the granddaughter of noted children's author Jacob Abbott. Eleanor Hallowell Abbott grew up surrounded by literary and religious luminaries due to her father and grandfather. This resulted in her growing up knowing many famous literary people, like Longfellow and Lowell. This caused her childhood home to be one of great religious and scholarly thought.

After attending private schools in Cambridge, she began courses at Radcliffe College. After completing her studies, she worked as a secretary and teacher at Lowell State Normal School. Here, she began to write poetry and short stories, but had little success in the beginning. It was only when Harper's Magazine accepted two of her poems that she saw promise in her work. This led to her winning three short-story prizes offered by Collier's and The Delineator.

Later life and literary career
In 1908 Abbott married Dr. Fordyce Coburn and relocated with him to Wilton, New Hampshire. Dr. Coburn was a medical advisor of the Lowell High School and would help his wife with her writing. Soon after moving, several widely read magazines accepted her work for publication. Two of her poems were accepted by Harper’s Monthly Magazine in 1909. She went on to publish seventy-five short stories and fourteen romantic novels. Being Little in Cambridge When Everyone Else Was Big is an autobiography written by Abbott about her childhood in Cambridge.

Abbott tells of how when she was a child, she was a nervous and excitable one, and through her fiction, she got in touch with this side to her. This is shown greatly through her work's intensity of feeling. Her writing is one of romance and even though some of her characters go through tough and painful times, each of her novels and stories carries a happy conclusion. The principal characters she uses are young girls who exhibit audacious behavior, are high strung, terribly talkative and full of unsettling demands while their male counterparts are the opposite - quiet, strong and tough against patient suffering.

Abbott gives a unique style and aims for spontaneity and originality. She writes with extreme vivacity and startling imagery. Abbott would not allow her work to be published unless she truly liked it herself. Her chief concern while writing was to use her own feeling about the story she was working on. Due to this unique style, many critics comment that even though her work is charming it can feel sometimes forced. In spite of this, Abbott's work reveals the turning away from the harshness of the New England surroundings that was in place at the time.

Abbott had no children. She died in 1958 in Portsmouth, New Hampshire.

The Eleanor Hallowell Abbott Papers are held by The University of New Hampshire Library in the Milne Special Collections. The collection primarily consists of typescripts of Abbott's short stories.

Selected works

Molly Make-Believe 1910
The Sick-a-Bed Lady (and other tales) 1911
The White Linen Nurse 1913
Little Eve Edgarton 1914
The Indiscreet Letter 1915
The Ne'er Do Much 1918
Love and Mrs. Kendrue 1919
Old-Dad 1919
Peace on Earth, Good-will to Dogs 1920
Rainy Week 1921
Silver Moon 1923
But Once A Year: Christmas Stories 1928
Being Little in Cambridge when Everyone Else was Big 1936

Film adaptations
Molly Make-Believe, directed by J. Searle Dawley (1916, based on the novel Molly Make-Believe)
Little Eve Edgarton, directed by Robert Z. Leonard (1916, based on the novel Little Eve Edgarton)
Old Dad, directed by Lloyd Ingraham (1920, based on the novel Old Dad)

References

Further reading

External links

 
 
 

1872 births
1958 deaths
American children's writers
Writers from Cambridge, Massachusetts
Radcliffe College alumni
American women poets
American women novelists
20th-century American novelists
Novelists from Massachusetts
People from Wilton, New Hampshire
Novelists from New Hampshire
American women children's writers
20th-century American women writers
20th-century American poets